Nick Milroy (born April 15, 1974) is an American fisheries biologist and Democratic politician from Superior, Wisconsin.  He was a member of the Wisconsin State Assembly for seven terms, representing the 73rd Assembly district from 2009 through 2022.

Biography
Nick Milroy was born in Duluth, Minnesota and raised in Superior, Wisconsin. His parents were public school teachers and local small business owners. Nick's wife, Julie, is also a public school teacher. The couple are parents to two sons, Maverik and MacLane, and a daughter, Marleigh.   
 
Immediately after graduation from Superior Senior High School, Nick enlisted in the United States Navy where he deployed to the Persian Gulf in support of Operation Southern Watch. Upon his return, he continued to serve in the Navy Reserve while pursuing his biology degree at the University of Wisconsin–Superior and also attended University of Wisconsin–Eau Claire. He later taught biology at the University of Wisconsin–Eau Claire. He also served on the Superior Common Council.  
 
He was appointed to a regional board to reduce mercury pollution in the St. Louis River watershed and formerly served as an international representative on the Lake Superior Binational Forum. He has also worked as a biologist for state, federal, and tribal agencies. Milroy is currently serving his second term where he is dedicated to supporting working families and providing a voice for those who might otherwise go unheard.
 
As a legislator, Milroy uses his extensive biology and natural resource expertise as a member of the Committees on Natural Resources, Forestry, and Veterans and Military Affairs in the Wisconsin State Assembly.

Milroy is listed in the Freshwater Fishing Hall of Fame. In 1989 while ice fishing on Lake Superior, he caught a 24" Steelhead.

Capitol Incident
On March 3, 2011, Milroy was tackled by law enforcement officers while attempting to enter the Capitol during the emotionally charged 2011 Wisconsin protests to retrieve clothing. He said in a statement that "no harm was done", but criticized the "armed-palace environment created by Gov. Scott Walker".

References

External links
Wisconsin Assembly - Representative Nick Milroy official government website
Nick Milroy official campaign website
 
Follow the Money - Nick Milroy
2008 campaign contributions
Nick Milroy campaign contributions at Wisconsin Democracy Campaign

1974 births
Living people
Politicians from Superior, Wisconsin
Politicians from Duluth, Minnesota
University of Wisconsin–Eau Claire alumni
University of Wisconsin–Superior alumni
University of Wisconsin–Eau Claire faculty
21st-century American biologists
Wisconsin city council members
Democratic Party members of the Wisconsin State Assembly
21st-century American politicians